Sergey Ivanovich Belyavsky (December 7, 1883 (Julian calendar: November 25) – October 13, 1953) was a Soviet/Russian astronomer and a discoverer of 36 numbered minor planets.

His last name is also alternatively spelled Beljavskij (name under which the Minor Planet Center credits him) or Beljawskij. His first name is occasionally given as "Sergius". He was born in St. Petersburg and was a member of the Academy of Sciences of the Soviet Union. His field of work included astrophotometry, astrometry, and the study of variable stars. He died in Leningrad.

He discovered the bright naked-eye comet C/1911 S3 (Beljawsky), also known according to the nomenclature of the time as "Comet 1911 IV" or "Comet 1911g". Belyavsky observed at Simeiz Observatory (Симеиз) in Crimea. Between 1937 and 1944, Belyavsky was the seventh director of the Pulkovo Observatory, where he succeeded Boris Gerasimovich.

List of discovered minor planets

References

External links 
 Genealogy  

1883 births
1953 deaths
Discoverers of asteroids
Discoverers of comets

Scientists from Saint Petersburg
Soviet astronomers